Lintu Rony (née Thomas), previously credited as Nila Raj, is a British actress who appears in South Indian films and TV serials. She is known for her role in the television series Bharya.

Career 
Lintu made her Malayalam film debut with Vaadamalli (2011) where she portrayed a friend of Richa Panai. In 2014, she played one of the leads in the television series Ennu Swantham Koottukari on Mazhavil Manorama. In Bharya, she plays a Muslim girl named Rehana. In 2016, she played one of the three heroines in Out of Range. That same year, Lintu made her Tamil film debut with Zero (2016). In 2015, she played one of the two heroines in Ond Chance Kodi, which marks her Kannada debut. She has acted in over 30 Malayalam language films. She also has garnered praise for her videos on TikTok. She played a notable role in 2021 Tamil movie Master.

Personal Life 
She is a Malayali from Nilambur. She is married to Rony Eippen Mathew, a technical consultant in London.

Filmography

Films 
All films are in Malayalam, unless otherwise noted.

Television

Music videos

References

External links 

Living people
Actresses from Kerala
Indian film actresses
Actresses in Malayalam cinema
Actresses in Tamil cinema
Year of birth missing (living people)
Actresses in Malayalam television
Actresses in Kannada cinema